The Uijeongbu Yi Sun-ho lawyer scandal was a 1997 judicial scandal in Uijeongbu, Gyeonggi-do, South Korea. For the first time in South Korean judicial history, prosecutors investigated a large number of sitting judges; they found that fifteen District Court judges had received millions of won in payments from attorneys. In the end the judges were not indicted because prosecutors believed the money had no direct connection with their legal duties. However, judges who received sums greater than one million won were obliged to resign, while those who received smaller amounts suffered demotion or disciplinary measures. Along with a 1998 bribery scandal in Daejeon, the Uijeongbu scandal was one of the motivations behind a law, finally passed by the National Assembly in 2000, which attempted to address the issue of special treatment shown to judges who retired to become lawyers in private practise. The scandals also lead to a revision of the code of judicial ethics banning cash thank-you gifts.

References

Further reading

1997 in South Korea
1997 scandals
Legal history of South Korea
Scandals in South Korea
Uijeongbu